UFC Fight Night: Maia vs. Shields (also known as UFC Fight Night 29) was a mixed martial arts event held on October 9, 2013, at the Ginásio José Corrêa in Barueri, Brazil. The event was broadcast live on Fox Sports 1.

Background
The event was headlined by a welterweight bout between Demian Maia and Jake Shields, with the main card broadcast on Fox Sports 1.

Rony Jason was expected to face Jeremy Stephens at this event. However, Jason and Stephens both pulled out due to injuries and the bout was rescheduled for UFC Fight Night 32.

Rodrigo Damm was expected to face Hacran Dias at the event.  However, the bout was scrapped just days prior to the event after Damm was sidelined due to a kidney stone attack.

Thiago Silva came in 2 lb over the 206 lb weight limit and therefore Matt Hamill received 25% of Silva's purse.  Their bout took place at a catchweight of 208 lb. Dana White stated Silva would be ineligible for any finishing bonuses, no matter the outcome of the fight, due to his missing weight.

Even though he was the only fighter to win by submission on the card, Rousimar Palhares was denied the Submission of the Night bonus after holding the submission after Mike Pierce had tapped, requiring the referee to physically release him. The following day, Dana White announced that Palhares would be released from his contract and banned from working at UFC ever again. He had done the same at UFC 111, earning a 90-day suspension, and was also suspended for nine months after testing positive for elevated testosterone following his loss to Héctor Lombard at UFC on FX: Sotiropoulos vs. Pearson.

Results

Bonus awards
The following fighters were awarded $50,000 bonuses.
 Fight of The Night: Raphael Assunção vs. T.J. Dillashaw
 Knockout of The Night: Dong Hyun Kim
 Submission of the Night: None awarded

See also
List of UFC events
2013 in UFC

References

UFC Fight Night
2013 in mixed martial arts
Mixed martial arts in Brazil
Sport in Barueri
2013 in Brazilian sport